Fazal Shah Sayyad (1827–1890) was a Punjabi poet known for his qissas (long poems) on tragic romances such as Sohni Mahiwal, Heer Ranjha and Laila Majnu.  Of this body of work, the poem Sohni Mahiwal "has been considered his best".

He was born in 1827 in British India, and resided in Newan Kot, a suburb of Lahore (modern Pakistan).

References

1827 births
1890 deaths
Punjabi-language poets